Galendromimus is a genus of mites in the Phytoseiidae family.

Species
 Galendromimus alveolaris (De Leon, 1957)
 Galendromimus borinquensis (De Leon, 1965)
 Galendromimus multipoculi Zacarias, Moraes & McMurtry, 2002
 Galendromimus paulista Zacarias & Moraes, 2001
 Galendromimus sanctus De Leon, 1967
 Galendromimus tunapunensis De Leon, 1967

References

Phytoseiidae